Promo or promos may refer to:

Promotions and advertising
Promo (media), a form of commercial advertising used to promote television or radio programs
Promo (professional wrestling), a televised interview in which a wrestler's on-screen personality is promoted to the fans
Promotion (marketing), one of the four aspects of marketing
Promotional music videos, such as those played on MTV
Promotional recording, a recording distributed free in order to promote a commercial recording

Other uses
Promo.com, a video maker and a cloud-based video creation service
"Promos" (The Office)
PROMO, an American advocacy group